Utricularia trichophylla is an aquatic or terrestrial carnivorous plant that belongs to the genus Utricularia (family Lentibulariaceae). It is native to Central and South America where it can be found in Belize, Bolivia, Brazil, French Guiana, Guyana, Nicaragua, Paraguay, Peru, Suriname, Trinidad, and Venezuela.

See also 
 List of Utricularia species

References 

Carnivorous plants of Central America
Carnivorous plants of South America
Flora of Belize
Flora of Bolivia
Flora of Brazil
Flora of French Guiana
Flora of Guyana
Flora of Nicaragua
Flora of Paraguay
Flora of Peru
Flora of Suriname
Flora of Trinidad and Tobago
Flora of Venezuela
trichophylla
Taxa named by Daniel Oliver
Taxa named by Richard Spruce